Synanthedon chrysidipennis is a moth of the family Sesiidae. It is found in western North America.

External links
Images
Bug Guide

Sesiidae
Moths described in 1869